Amoklauf is a 1994 German horror film written and directed by Uwe Boll. Boll's third feature, it established a number of directorial trademarks that would recur throughout the filmmakers's career, such as a scene involving a mass shooting, and a premise that revolves around "psychologically disturbed men and intersecting systems of oppression conspiring to unleash the violent potential within them."

Plot 

The film's unnamed protagonist flashes back to or fantasizes about murdering a female cyclist, and is then shown pessimistically contemplating human nature while watching an episode of The Price Is Right. After observing a pair of yuppies as they vivisect a fish at the restaurant where he works as a waiter, the man returns home to his barren apartment, where he further ponders humanity, this time while watching Mondo films. The waiter then burns a photograph of his mother, and flashes back to killing his father while the man was watching The Price Is Right.

The next day, the waiter begins masturbating and getting drunk, but is interrupted by his neighbor, who he stabs; he then returns to drinking and pleasuring himself while the woman bleeds to death next to him. After flashing back to witnessing a possible death in a washroom, the man proceeds to a park, where he shoots at least eight people, staggering off after one of the victims manages to stab him with a pocketknife.

Cast

Production 

Shot on purposely degraded 35 mm film, Amoklauf was personally financed by Boll using the 50,000 Deutsche Marks that he had remaining in his business account after the dissolution of his partnership with Frank Lustig, who he had previously collaborated with on his earlier features German Fried Movie and Barschel – Mord in Genf. Fearing that Amoklauf could be his final film, Boll made it "as if I were saying goodbye" and thus gave it a melancholic tone, music that would "represent the end of a life" and a central theme that discussed "the capabilities of what humans can do."

Release 

Amoklauf premiered in Berlin, to some walkouts, and was subsequently screened at film festivals throughout both Germany and Paris. It was released on DVD in 2005 by Eurovideo and Screen Power Home Entertainment.

Reception 

While Jim McLennan of Film Blitz admitted that Amoklauf had "interesting" flourishes, he still gave the film a grade of D+, and opined that it was largely "amateur-hour stuff" that "overstays its welcome." Amoklauf was wholly condemned by The Worldwide Celluloid Massacre, which derisively dismissed it as being "Boring, slow and pointless."

References

External links 

 

1994 films
1994 horror films
1994 independent films
1990s exploitation films
1990s German films
1990s German-language films
1990s psychological horror films
1990s serial killer films
German horror films
German independent films
German psychological films
German serial killer films
Films about animal cruelty
Films about mass murder
Films directed by Uwe Boll
Films set in 1994
Films set in apartment buildings
Films set in Germany
Films set in parks
Films set in restaurants
Films shot in Germany
Masturbation in fiction
Patricide in fiction
Works about philosophical pessimism